The 2015–16 BIC Basket (38th edition), Angola's top tier basketball club competition, will run from January 8, 2016 through June, 2016. It consists of four stages plus the playoffs. At the initial stage (regular season) all ten teams played each other in a double round robin system. In stage 2 (group stage 1), the first six teams from the regular season played in a single round robin in each group. In stage 3 (group stage 2), the first five teams from group stage 1 played in a round robin in group A whereas the four teams in group B plus the relegated team from group A played round robin classification matches in group B. In stage 4 (semifinals), the first-seeded team played a best-of-five series with the fourth-seeded team whereas the 2nd-seeded team played the third-seeded team with the winners playing a best-of-seven series of matches for the title and the losers playing a best-of-three series for third place. The 5th-seeded team from group A joined group B to play the group's 3rd-seeded team also in a best-of-five series whereas 1st-seeded plays 2nd seeded. Winners of those group B matches played a best-of-seven series for seventh place, the losers played a best-of-three for ninth place whereas the last two teams in group B will be relegated to the 2nd division championship.

BIC Basket Participants (2015–16 Season)

Regular Season (November 20, 2015 - March 13, 2016)

 Note: Numbers in brackets indicate round number and leg

Regular season standings
Updated as of 3 March 2016

 1 loss by default (no point awarded)

Group stage 1 (March 25, 2016 - April 20, 2016)
Times given below are in WAT UTC+1.

Group A

 Note: Primeiro de Agosto was awarded a bonus point for finishing first in regular season Advance to next stage Relegated to Group B

Group B

Group stage 2 (April 29, 2016 – May 10, 2016)
Times given below are in WAT UTC+1.

Group A

 Note: Recreativo do Libolo was awarded a bonus point for finishing first in Group stage 1 Advance to semi-finals Relegated to Group B

Group B

Semi-finals (May 14–24, 2016)

Petro Atlético vs 1º de Agosto

Rec do Libolo vs Interclube

Third place

Finals (May 28–June 7, 2016)

Awards
 MVP
  Gildo Santos (1º de Agosto)

Top Scorer
  Carlos Morais (Rec do Libolo)

Top Rebounder
  Jason Cain (Petro de Luanda)

Top Assistor
  Gerson Domingos (Interclube)

See also
BIC Basket
2015 2nd Division Basketball
BAI Basket Past Seasons
Federação Angolana de Basquetebol

External links
Angolan Basketball Federation at Fiba Live Stats
Schedules & results
List of players
Official Website 
Africabasket.com League Page at Africabasket

References

Angolan Basketball League seasons
League
Angola